Roman Bierła (born March 21, 1957 in Katowice) is a Polish wrestler (Greco-Roman style).

References
 
 Sports123.com
 FILA Wrestling Database

1957 births
Living people
Olympic silver medalists for Poland
Olympic wrestlers of Poland
Wrestlers at the 1980 Summer Olympics
Polish male sport wrestlers
Olympic medalists in wrestling
Sportspeople from Katowice
Medalists at the 1980 Summer Olympics
20th-century Polish people
21st-century Polish people